commonly known as  is a Japanese football club based in Machida, Tokyo. The club currently play in the J2 League, the Japanese second tier of professional league football.

History
Machida is known as the "Brazil of Tokyo" due to the popularity of football in the city; in fact, it has produced the second-largest number of J. League players though its football school. Originally formed in 1977, this school is well known for its development of young talents into professional players. In 1989, in order to retain talents, Machida founded its own top team, which at that time played in the Tokyo Prefectural League.

In 2003, they became a multi-sport club under the name Athletic Club Machida, and in 2005 were promoted to the Kanto League, having won the Tokyo Prefectural League (First Division). They came first in the Kanto league (Second Division) the following year, and were promoted to First Division, where they stayed until promotion to the Japan Football League as champions of the Regional Promotion Playoff Series in 2008.

In 2009, they adopted the current nickname Zelvia, a portmanteau of the Portuguese words zelkova (Machida city's official tree) and salvia (a grassy plant commonly used in football pitches).

The same year, the club declared its intent to be promoted to J. League's 2nd division, and its status of semi-affiliate was officially approved by the J. League. However, its home stadium capacity and light specifications did not meet the J. League's requirements, average attendance did not reach 3,000, and the team's final position of 6th place did not allow for Zelvia's promotion to the J. League.

In 2010, Machida Zelvia appointed Naoki Soma, a former star player who played in the 1998 FIFA World Cup, as its new head coach. The stadium's lighting was renewed, and club added several J. League players to its roster. Zelvia also announced its partnership with Major League Soccer's D.C. United, which became the first historic partnership between a Japanese and American club. The reborn team beat Tokyo Verdy, its arch-rival from the J. League, in the Emperor's Cup, but was knocked out by Albirex Niigata in the third round. Soma left at the end of the season and was replaced by Ranko Popović, former coach of Oita Trinita.

The stadium's capacity and conditions were still short of fulfilling J. League criteria, so the club completed another renovation between the end of the 2010 and start of the 2011 seasons. Machida Zelvia finished the 2011 season in third place after beating Kamatamare Sanuki in the final match of that season, thereby granting them promotion to J. League (Second Division), but were relegated after a bottom-placed finish. They became one of the original J3 clubs after finishing in 4th place in the 2014 JFL season and returned to J2 as 2015 runners-up by beating Oita Trinita in the promotion/relegation play-off.

Stadium
Machida Zelvia currently plays at Machida Municipal Athletic Stadium (Nozuta Stadium). Capacity until 2011 was 6,200, including grassy areas, and has had lighting for night games since 2009. Between the 2010 and 2011 seasons the stadium was upgraded and is now all-seated. Although the minimum seating requirement for J2 is 10,000, Nozuta fell short of that number. However, under an agreement made with J-League officials, home games where a large attendance is expected will be played at other stadia leased specifically for the purpose, and upgrades to Nozuta were made to meet the 10,000-capacity requirement. The current capacity of the stadium is 15,489.

League and cup record

Key

Honours
Kanto Soccer League
 Champions (2): 2007, 2008
Japanese Regional League
 Champions (1): 2008

Kit evolution

Colour, sponsors and manufacturers

Current squad
As of 16 March 2023.

Out on loan

Technical staff
Staff for the 2023 season.

Managerial history

Notes

References

External links
 
  
  

 
Machida
CyberAgent
Machida
Machida
Football clubs in Tokyo
Multi-sport clubs in Japan
1989 establishments in Japan
Japan Football League clubs
Machida, Tokyo